Athletics at the 1976 Summer Paralympics consisted of 207 events. Argentina, Burma, Hong Kong, Indonesia and Peru won their first ever medals in the 1976 Summer Paralympics.

Participating nations

Medal table

Medal summary

Men's events

Women's events

References 

 

 
1976 Summer Paralympics events
1976
Paralympics